Wu Zetian is a Chinese television series based on the life of Wu Zetian, the only woman in Chinese history to assume the title of Empress Regnant and became the de facto ruler of China in the late seventh century. Directed by Chen Jialin, the series starred Liu Xiaoqing as the title character. It was first broadcast on CCTV in China in 1995 and subsequently aired by television stations in other countries.

Plot
One night, Wu Meiniang was bestowed favor upon by Emperor Taizong for the first time since she entered the palace. The innocent girl turned into ruthless and cruel woman after experiencing the cruelty of court life and escaped death several times. She was even betrayed by Xu Hui, her confidante and another consort. After the death of Emperor Taizong, Wu Meiniang was thrown into Ganye Temple and forced to become a nun. She suffered constant humiliation but was saved by Emperor Gaozong. He took her back into the palace and changed her identity from a mad a Zhaoyi (1st rank imperial consort). To survive in the court, Wu Meiniang personally strangled her daughter to frame Empress Wang, defeated the prime minister Zhangsun Wuji, and finally became the Empress. She and Emperor Gaozong have a love-hate relationship, and after his death, she took the throne and changed the Tang dynasty to the Zhou Dynasty.

Cast

 Liu Xiaoqing as Wu Zetian
 Bao Guo'an as Emperor Taizong of Tang
 Li Jianqun as Xu Hui
 Liu Yubin as Zhangsun Wuji
 Wang Pei as Fang Xuanling
 Huang Fei as Wei Zheng
 Zhang Guangzheng as Chu Suiliang
 Lü Qi as Li Shiji
 Hong Jiantao as Li Tai
 Guo Li as Hegan Chengji
 Ma Li as Princess Gaoyang
 Zhang Duofu as Bianji
 Lü Guobin as Fang Yi'ai
 Yu Meng as Ling'er
 Gao Bo as Yu'er
 Chen Baoguo as Emperor Gaozong of Tang
 Zheng Shuang as Empress Wang
 Lü Zhong as Lady Liu
 Yu Hui as Consort Xiao
 Jin Shuyuan as Lady of Rong
 Mu Ning as Lady of Han
 Miao Yiyi as Lady of Wei
 Wu Liping as Wang Fulai
 Xiao Xiaohua as Xiaoshunzi
 Qiu Yongli as Li Yifu
 Li Ruping as Xu Jingzong
 Liu Dagang as Han Yuan
 Chen Weiguo as Liu Shi
 Li Ming as Shangguan Yi
 Gao Xi'an as Wu Yuanqing
 Yu Yunhe as Wu Yuanshuang
 Xu Xiaochuan as young Li Zhong
 Yang Junyong as Li Sujie
 Li Ang as young Li Sujie
 Jiang Junnan as Li Hong
 Ou Yang as young Li Hong
 Liu Yanjun as Li Xian
 Wang Zhihua as Yuan Gongyu
 Pu Zhenghu as Wei Jifang
 Wang Yue as Bi Zhengyi
 Mi Li as Lady Chunyu
 Han Zaifeng as Persian shopkeeper
 Dantai Renhui as Old nun
 Lei Yueqin as Nun
 Zhou Shiyi as Emperor Zhongzong of Tang
 Guo Shuping as Empress Wei
 Liang Li as Princess Taiping
 Ruping as Shangguan Wan'er
 Hai Yan as Shangguan Wan'er's mother
 Chen Zheng as Wu Chengsi
 Zhang Qiuge as Huaiyi
 Jiang Yang as Zhang Changzong
 Liu Xudong as Zhang Yizhi
 Han Qing as Emperor Ruizong of Tang
 Gao Li as Consort Liu
 Xia Song as Consort Dou
 Tan Feiling as Pei Yan
 Wang Bing as Di Renjie
 Xu Zhengyun as Wei Yuanzhong
 Shao Wanlin as Zhang Jianzhi
 Chen Lihui as Li Jingye
 Xue Yong as Luo Binwang
 Tang Zhijiang as Qiu Shenji
 Cao Lian as Lai Junchen
 Wang Jun as Zhou Xing
 Xue Wencheng as Yu Baojia
 Deng Guangxun as Suo Yuanli
 Yu Qian as Li Zhuan
 Li Donghong as Gao Shun
 Fan Jia

External links
 
  Wu Zetian on Sina.com

1995 Chinese television series debuts
Television series set in the Tang dynasty
Television series set in the Zhou dynasty (690–705)
Works about Wu Zetian
Mandarin-language television shows
Chinese historical television series
Cultural depictions of Wu Zetian
Cultural depictions of Di Renjie
Television series set in the 7th century